Samuel Ratsch (born January 7, 1993), better known by the ring name Darby Allin, is an American professional wrestler signed to All Elite Wrestling (AEW), where he is a former two-time AEW TNT Champion. He is also known for his appearances in World Wrestling Network promotions, wrestling for Evolve.

Early life 
Growing up, Ratsch took part in track and field and played football as one of his grandfathers played in the NFL. He also took part in amateur wrestling, but only because he assumed it was professional wrestling. He later attended a film school in Arizona, dropping out to pursue a career in skateboarding. Through his connections with Matt Schlager, Ratsch regularly appeared in video clips with his friends on Ridiculousness, until one video was too extreme for the program to air. He also appeared on an episode of Sex Sent Me to the ER, later admitting in an interview with Chris Van Vliet that the story was fabricated, as he needed the money. For about three years, Ratsch was intentionally homeless.

Professional wrestling career

Independent circuit (2015–2019) 

Ratsch made his professional wrestling debut in late 2014 for Blue Collar Wrestling in Portland, Oregon under the ring name Darby Graves, before changing it to Darby Allin. Between the years 2015 to 2019, Darby Allin wrestled for wrestling promotions like EVOLVE Wrestling, Pro Wrestling REVOLVER, Full Impact Pro, Pro Wrestling Guerilla, and Game Changer Wrestling (GCW).

World Wrestling Network (2016–2019) 
Allin debuted for World Wrestling Network at Evolve 59 in April 2016, losing to Ethan Page. At Evolve 74, Allin was defeated via countout by Brian Cage after Cage had powerslammed Allin over a barricade. Allin made his Style Battle debut in January 2017, losing to Dave Crist. Allin made his Full Impact Pro debut in early 2017 at FIP Everything Burns, losing a Fight For All match. On the same show, Allin, along with A. R. Fox, Dave Crist and Sami Callihan defeated Sammy Guevara, Dezmond Xavier, Jason Kincaid and Jason Cade. At Evolve 93, he was defeated by DJZ. in January 2018, Allin faced Zack Sabre Jr. for the Evolve Championship at EVOLVE 98, in a losing effort.

On August 30, 2018, it was announced that at Evolve 113, Allin would be facing NXT wrestler, the Velveteen Dream. At Evolve 113, Allin was defeated by Dream. At Evolve 116, Allin was defeated by Mustafa Ali. At Evolve 117, Allin was defeated by Kassius Ohno. The next night at Evolve 118, Allin was defeated by Roderick Strong.

During WrestleMania weekend, he wrestled his last match for Evolve at Evolve 125, in a defeat to Anthony Henry. He also wrestled at Amerika Ist Wunderbar, promoted by Westside Xtreme Wrestling (wXw), and in conjunction with WWN, where he was defeated by Avalanche. The following day at WWN Supershow Mercury Rising, he teamed with his wife Priscilla Kelly, where they were defeated by Austin Theory and Brandi Lauren. That same weekend, it was revealed he was going to be ending his three-year relationship with Evolve and WWN.

Lucha Libre AAA Worldwide (2018) 
On June 3, 2018, Allin made his Lucha Libre AAA Worldwide debut at Verano de Escándalo in a six-way match which was won by Aero Star. Other competitors in the match included Drago, Sammy Guevara, Australian Suicide and Golden Magic.

Progress Wrestling (2018–2019) 
In 2018, Allin wrestled for Progress Wrestling during their American tours. He made his debut for the promotion at Chapter 66: Mardi Graps, held in Louisiana, in a Thuderbastard match which was won by Jeff Cobb. He later appeared on day five of the Coast to Coast Tour, teaming with Jack Sexsmith and Toni Storm in a six-person tag team match.

On March 14, 2019, Allin was announced as a participant in the Super Strong Style 16. At the event, he was defeated by Paul Robinson. On day two, he teamed with Chris Ridgeway and Lucky Kid in a six-man lucha rules tag team match, defeating Artemis Spencer, Chris Brookes and DJZ. On day three, Allin took part in a scramble match, which was won by Brookes.

All Elite Wrestling (2019–present)

Initial appearances (2019–2020) 
On April 12, 2019, Allin signed with the newly launched All Elite Wrestling (AEW). He made his AEW debut at the Fyter Fest event on June 29, where he wrestled Cody to a time-limit draw. The following month at Fight for the Fallen, Allin teamed with Joey Janela and Jimmy Havoc in a losing effort to Shawn Spears, MJF and Sammy Guevara. After the match, the three men would blame each other for the loss and brawl backstage. Subsequently, a three-way match was arranged for the All Out pay-per-view on August 31, which Havoc won.

In October, Allin entered contention for the AEW World Championship, and would challenge Chris Jericho for the championship on the October 16 episode of Dynamite, but lost. At Bash at the Beach on January 15, 2020, Allin competed in a four-man tournament for number one contendership to the AEW World Championship, but lost in the first round to Pac. Following this, Allin began a feud with Sammy Guevara, an ally of Jericho's. The two faced at Revolution on February 29, where Allin emerged victorious. In April, Allin competed in a tournament to crown to the inaugural holder of the AEW TNT Championship. After defeating Guevara in the first round, he was eliminated after losing to Cody in the semi-finals.

On May 23, Allin participated in the first-ever Casino Ladder Match at Double or Nothing in a losing effort as the match was won by the debuting Brian Cage. After an absence, Allin returned at Fight for the Fallen on July 15, attacking Cage with a skateboard. On the July 29 episode of Dynamite, Allin teamed with AEW World Champion Jon Moxley to defeat Cage and Ricky Starks in a tornado tag team match, with Allin subsequently being granted a match against Moxley for the championship. The match took place on the following week's episode of Dynamite, where Allin was defeated. On August 29, a 30-second black-and-white segment of Allin doing a promo walking down a forest road with thumbtacks in his back, and then proceeding to climb up to the top of a bridge and jump off it into a river. On September 5, Allin competed in the 21-man Casino Battle Royale at All Out, but was eliminated by Cage. On the September 30 episode of Dynamite, Allin faced off against nemesis Ricky Starks in a winning effort.

TNT Champion and partnership with Sting (2020–present) 

On November 7, 2020, Allin won the AEW TNT Championship at Full Gear by defeating Cody Rhodes. Rhodes and Allin would afterwards unite in a feud with Team Taz. On the November 18, 2020 episode of Dynamite, Will Hobbs turned heel after assisting Taz, Brian Cage and Ricky Starks in attacking both Allin and Rhodes. On the December 2, 2020 special Winter Is Coming, Allin and Rhodes teamed up to defeat Hobbs and Starks, and after the match, Sting made his AEW debut and ran off Team Taz when they jumped Allin and Rhodes, after which Allin and Sting stared each other down. On the January 13, 2021 special New Year's Smash Night 2, Allin made his first successful title defense against Brian Cage. On January 21, it was announced that Allin and Sting would be taking on Team Taz's Ricky Starks and Brian Cage in a street fight at Revolution. At Revolution, Allin and Sting were victorious over Team Taz in a cinematic pre-taped match. On March 10, 2021 episode of Dynamite, Allin successfully defended the AEW TNT Championship against Scorpio Sky. 

On March 17, Allin issued an open challenge to the Dark Order as a tribute to the late "greatest TNT Champion of all time" Brodie Lee, which was responded by John Silver. The next week, Allin defeated Silver to retain the title. He made further successful defenses of the TNT Championship against JD Drake on the April 7 episode of Dynamite and against The Butcher at AEW's first non-televised event two days later, while also starting a feud with Matt Hardy. On April 21, Allin successfully defended the AEW TNT Championship against Jungle Boy. On April 28, Allin successfully defended the title against Dark Order’s 10, before being attacked by Scorpio Sky and Ethan Page. Sky and Page would then themselves be attacked by Lance Archer and Dark Order’s 10, saving Sting and Allin in the process.

On the May 12 episode of Dynamite, Allin lost the TNT Championship to Miro, ending his record-setting reign at 186 days. At Double or Nothing Allin teamed up with Sting to defeat the team of Scorpio Sky and Ethan Page. He defeated Page in AEW's first ever Coffin Match at Night 1 of Fyter Fest on July 14, putting an end to their feud. 

On the August 20 episode of AEW Rampage titled The First Dance, Allin was challenged to a pay-per-view match at All Out by CM Punk, who had made his AEW debut after an absence of seven years from professional wrestling. Allin lost the match to Punk.

At Revolution 2022, Allin would win a Tornado tag team match with Sammy Guevara and Sting over Andrade El Idolo, Matt Hardy, and Isiah Kassidy.

On the May 11, 2022 episode of Dynamite, Allin wrestled Jeff Hardy. Despite losing, Allin performed a jump off a tall ladder which got media attention.

In December 2022, Allin would start a fued with reigning TNT Champion, Samoa Joe. On the January 4, 2023 episode of Dynamite in his home town of Seattle, Washington, Allin defeated Samoa Joe to win the TNT Championship for the second time. After successfully defending the title four times over the span of four weeks on Dynamite and Rampage, Allin lost the title back to Samoa Joe in a No Holds Barred match on the February 1 edition of Dynamite, ending Allin's second TNT title reign at 28 days.

Professional wrestling style and persona
Ratsch incorporates many elements of his personal life into his wrestling persona; a longtime fan of punk rock, Ratsch's current ring name Darby Allin is derived from the frontman of the Germs, Darby Crash, and the transgressive musician GG Allin, while his signature face paint, in which he paints half his face in a skull design, is born out of Ratsch's sentiment that he has been "half dead" since surviving the car accident in which his uncle died. Another aspect of Ratsch's background he incorporates into his wrestling is skateboarding, as he rides a skateboard to the ring during his entrance, and occasionally uses it as a weapon. Previous to his career taking off in professional wrestling, Ratsch also sought to be a professional skateboarder. Ratsch was initially hesitant to integrate his skateboarding into his pro wrestling work, fearing that both the wrestling and skateboarding fandoms would perceive it as inauthentic; however, he overcame his doubts following encouragement and advice from Chris Jericho.

Personal life 
Ratsch lives a straight edge lifestyle, which he adopted in part due to a traumatic incident during his childhood: as a five-year-old, Ratsch was a passenger in a car when his uncle was driving while intoxicated; his uncle lost control of the vehicle and was killed in the resulting crash. 

On November 21, 2018, Ratsch married fellow wrestler Priscilla Kelly, who currently wrestles for WWE as part of the NXT roster under the name Gigi Dolin. On August 10, 2020, the couple announced they were divorcing. In December 2020, Kelly confirmed during an appearance on Vickie Guerrero's Excuse Me podcast that they were no longer married, but remain friends.

Filmography

Television

Championships and accomplishments
 All Elite Wrestling
 AEW TNT Championship (2 times)
Dynamite Award for Breakout Star – Male (2021)
 Northeast Wrestling
 NEW Heavyweight Championship (1 time)
 Pro Wrestling Illustrated
 Ranked No. 14 of the top 500 singles wrestlers in the PWI 500 in 2021
 Style Battle
 Style Battle 7 (2017)
 Wrestling Observer Newsletter Awards
 Non-Heavyweight MVP (2021)

References

External links

 
 
 

1997 births
21st-century professional wrestlers
All Elite Wrestling personnel
American male film actors
American male professional wrestlers
American skateboarders
Living people
Male actors from Seattle
Professional wrestlers from Washington (state)
Sportspeople from Seattle
Street people
AEW TNT Champions